NBC Sports Chicago (formerly Comcast SportsNet Chicago) is an American regional sports network that broadcasts regional coverage of professional sports teams in the Chicago metropolitan area, as well as college sports events and original sports-related news, discussion and entertainment programming. It is branded as part of the NBC Sports Regional Networks.

NBC Sports Chicago is owned by a consortium of Comcast (which owns 25% through the NBC Sports Group unit of NBCUniversal), Chicago Bulls and White Sox owner Jerry Reinsdorf (who owns a 50% majority interest), and Chicago Blackhawks owner Rocky Wirtz (who owns 25%). The Chicago Cubs, through the Tribune Company and later the family of J. Joseph Ricketts, formerly owned a 20% stake in the network from its launch until the Cubs ended their broadcasts on the network after the end of the 2019 season, with that percentage equally distributed in 5% increments to the remaining partners after that point.

The channel is available on cable and fiber optic television providers in most of Illinois, and throughout northwest Indiana, Iowa, Kenosha County, Wisconsin and southwest Michigan and nationwide on satellite provider DirecTV. The network maintains main studios and offices located at 350 North Orleans Street, inside the River North Point Center in the Near North Side area.

History
In November 2003, Jerry Reinsdorf, Bill Wirtz and the Tribune Company decided to end their cable television agreements for the Bulls, White Sox, Cubs and Blackhawks with FSN Chicago, stripping that network of broadcast rights to all of the professional sports teams in the Chicago area. All three team owners decided to enter into a partnership with Comcast to form a new regional sports network, to be named Comcast SportsNet Chicago, whose launch was formally announced on December 2. CSN Chicago was created in order for the four teams to have editorial control over their broadcasts, although the network continued to share the rights to the Cubs, White Sox, Blackhawks and Bulls with WGN-TV (channel 9; which is owned by Tribune) and (until 2014) WCIU-TV (channel 26).

Comcast SportsNet Chicago launched on October 1, 2004. At that time, with the loss of all four teams from its lineup, FSN Chicago was effectively left with only events from some minor local and semi-professional teams, national programming from Fox Sports Net, and Midwestern outdoors programs on its schedule; many cable and satellite providers in northeastern Illinois and northwest Indiana also chose to replace FSN Chicago with CSN Chicago upon its launch.

After Rainbow Media shut down FSN Chicago on June 23, 2006, Comcast SportsNet Chicago acquired the regional cable television rights to broadcast sports events, discussion and entertainment programs intended for national distribution to the Fox Sports regional networks. The network subsequently relocated its operations into FSN Chicago's former studio facilities on Orleans Street (which NBC Sports Chicago now also shares with the offices of the Chicago Sun-Times).

On April 2, 2007, the Tribune Company announced its intent to sell its shares in both Comcast SportsNet Chicago and the Chicago Cubs as part of the company's $8.2 billion purchase by real estate magnate Sam Zell.

After inheriting the team from father Bill Wirtz upon his death in September 2007, new Chicago Blackhawks owner Rocky Wirtz decided to lift his father's years-long ban on local televised coverage of the team's home games (which the elder Wirtz imposed as a means to sustain ticket sales). On March 30, 2008, the Blackhawks announced a new broadcasting rights agreement. The team renewed CSN Chicago's broadcast rights (with the network carrying the bulk of the games), while local broadcasts were split between CSN Chicago and WGN-TV effective with the 2008–09 season; all of the team's games (both home and away) would be televised in high definition (due to the NHL's broadcast contracts, including ironically one with eventual Comcast division NBCUniversal, WGN-TV was barred from carrying its share of Blackhawks telecasts on its former national superstation feed WGN America, although its game telecasts were available in Canada through the station's carriage as a superstation on domestic cable and satellite providers).

Comcast SportsNet Chicago, along with the other Comcast SportsNet-branded networks, implemented a new network logo style (utilizing Comcast's then-universal corporate logo) and graphics package on October 1, 2008, coinciding with the fourth anniversary of the network's launch.

On January 5, 2009, the network premiered Monsters in the Morning, a weekday morning talk show hosted by former WSCR radio host Mike North and Comcast SportsNet Chicago reporter and former Chicago Bear Dan Jiggetts. The program was cancelled in January 2010, due to problems involving the show, including the program's main sponsor, the now-defunct online sports channel ChicagoSportsWebio.com, being implicated in defrauding North, Jiggetts and others in a money laundering scheme in June 2009; North subsequently became the host of Monsters and Money in the Morning, a short-lived program for CBS owned-and-operated station WBBM-TV (channel 2), which briefly replaced that station's morning newscast.

On August 21, 2009, the Tribune Company sold its interests in the Chicago Cubs, Wrigley Field and 25% of Comcast SportsNet Chicago to the family of TD Ameritrade founder J. Joseph Ricketts for $845 million.

With Comcast's acquisition of NBC Universal (owners of NBC and Telemundo Owned & Operated duopoly stations WMAQ-TV and WSNS-TV) in February 2011, Comcast SportsNet was also integrated into the new NBC Sports Group unit, culminating with the addition of the peacock logo in September 2012 and an updated graphics package based on that introduced by NBC Sports for its NBC and national cable broadcasts in January 2013. The updated graphics were implemented on CSN's live game coverage and all studio shows, with the exception of SportsNet Central.

In September 2012, Comcast SportsNet Chicago and its sister Comcast SportsNet outlets ceased carrying Fox Sports Networks-supplied programming, after failing to reach an agreement to continue carrying FSN's nationally distributed programs. SportsNet Central would ultimately implement a new on-air look of its own and on April 14, 2014, in conjunction with that change, the program switched to the updated graphics package introduced three years earlier.

On October 2, 2017, the network was rebranded as NBC Sports Chicago, as part of a larger rebranding of the Comcast SportsNet networks under the NBC Sports brand.

On January 2, 2019, the White Sox, Bulls, and Blackhawks agreed to an exclusive multi-year deal with NBC Sports Chicago beginning in the fall of 2019, ending their broadcasts on WGN-TV. The Cubs, with the 2020 launch of the team-owned Marquee Sports Network, moved their games to that cable channel after 15 years with the network ending with the 2019 season.

In April 2019, the network acquired regional rights to the Chicago Red Stars of the National Women's Soccer League.

On October 1, 2019 Dish dropped NBC Sports Chicago from both its satellite service and its streaming service Sling.

In July 2021, it was announced that the Sinclair Broadcast Group (part owner of Marquee Sports Network and owners of the Bally Sports Regional Networks) considering buying NBC Sports Chicago and the entire NBC Sports Regional Networks unit from Comcast and could possibly to become the sister channel of Marquee, along with Sinclair's owned stations in the state of Illinois including ABC affiliated stations WICS/WICD, its LMA partners Fox affiliated WRSP-TV/WCCU and The CW affiliated WBUI in Champaign-Urbana-Springfield, TBD owned & operated station WHOI in Peoria-Bloomington, Fox affiliated station KBSI and MyNetworkTV affiliated sister WDKA in Harrisburg (which is also serving the Cape Girardeau, Missouri-Paducah, Kentucky market), and CBS and ABC dual affiliated station KHQA-TV in Quincy (also serving the Hannibal, Missouri market) if the sale is completed.

Programming

Sports coverage

Through its majority ownership by the owners of each of the three teams, NBC Sports Chicago holds the regional cable television rights to air a majority of games involving the Chicago White Sox Major League Baseball club, the NBA's Chicago Bulls and the NHL's Chicago Blackhawks. The network also held the broadcast rights to games involving the Chicago Fire S.C. of Major League Soccer. The channel had held the broadcast rights to games of the now-defunct Chicago Rush of the Arena Football League.

On April 13, 2010, CSN Chicago announced that it had signed a contract with Chicago Fire S.C. to broadcast at least eight of the franchise's matches for the 2010 season; on January 26, 2015, Comcast SportsNet Chicago signed a three-year contract with the Chicago Fire to become the team's exclusive local television broadcaster, after having carried its games the previous two years on WPWR-TV.

The network also carries collegiate sports events including football games involving the Northern Illinois University Huskies and basketball games from the Illinois State University Redbirds. Prior to the termination of Comcast SportsNet's groupwide programming agreement with Fox Sports Networks, CSN Chicago additionally broadcast FSN's national programming following the shutdown of FSN Chicago, notably including the network's college sports coverage, such as Atlantic Coast Conference men's and women's basketball games (on Sundays), men's basketball games from the Pac-12 Conference (on various nights) and college football games from the Big 12 Conference and Pac-12 Conference (on Saturdays during the fall).

From 2016-2019, CSN Chicago obtained the exclusive rights to championship games for the Iowa High School Athletic Association in football, basketball and wrestling, replacing the previous model of a statewide broadcast network in Iowa of stations in each market.

Other programming
NBC Sports Chicago's flagship program was SportsNet Central, a nightly sports news program featuring live reports and coverage on the Chicago area's major sports teams as well as game highlights from local and national teams. The program also featured special regular segments such as "Luke-A-Likes," a popular segment hosted by Luke Stuckmeyer on nights when he hosted the program before his October 2019 departure. It was a viewer-voting segment featuring photos submitted by viewers claiming to resemble a particular sports figure) and the "Chicago Sports Trivia Question" (a bumper segment shown before and after a commercial break featuring trivia questions related to Chicago sports.

The network also carries team magazine and coaches shows focusing on the Bulls, Blackhawks and White Sox, as well as the Northern Illinois University and Illinois State University football and basketball teams. It will continue to carry unofficial Cubs coverage with the start of the 2020 MLB season.

CSN Chicago Sports Awards
Since the network launched in 2004, NBC Sports Chicago has hosted the CSN Chicago Sports Awards, an annual award show to raise money for the March of Dimes (this program dates back to 1987, when the children's charity started the benefit in partnership with SportsChannel Chicago, the later FSN Chicago). The honorees included top athletes from Chicago's professional sports teams, who were chosen based on their contributions to their teams and the Chicago community. To date, the "CSN Chicago Sports Awards" has raised over $6 million for the March of Dimes.

NBC Sports Chicago staff

On-air talent and journalists
 Patrick Boyle
 Chuck Garfien
 Jason Goff

Digital Insiders

 Charlie Roumeliotis – Blackhawks Insider
 Josh Schrock – Bears Insider
 K. C. Johnson – Bulls Insider

NBC Sports Chicago broadcasting

Chicago Bulls

 Adam Amin – play-by-play announcer
 Jason Benetti – alternative play-by-play announcer (fill–in)
 Mike Monaco – alternative play-by-play announcer (fill–in)
 Stacey King – game analyst
 Jason Goff – studio host
 Will Perdue – studio analyst
 Kendall Gill – studio analyst

Chicago Blackhawks

 Chris Vosters – play-by-play announcer
 Troy Murray – color commentator
 Patrick Sharp - color commentator
 Pat Boyle – studio host
 Colby Cohen – studio analyst, substitute color commentator
 Adam Burish - studio analyst

Chicago White Sox
 Jason Benetti – play-by-play announcer 
 Len Kasper – play-by-play announcer (fill-in)
 Steve Stone – game analyst
 Chuck Garfien – studio host
 Frank Thomas – studio analyst/fill-in game analyst
 Scott Podsednik – studio analyst
 Gordon Beckham – studio analyst/fill-in game analyst
 Ozzie Guillén – studio analyst

Chicago Bears
 Laurence Holmes – studio host
 Lance Briggs – studio analyst
 Alex Brown – studio analyst
 Dave Wannstedt – studio analyst

Related services

NBC Sports Chicago Plus
NBC Sports Chicago Plus is an overflow feed of NBC Sports Chicago, which is primarily used to alleviate scheduling conflicts that result when two sports events involving teams that the network holds the right to broadcast are scheduled to occur simultaneously. The network operates a secondary overflow, NBC Sports Chicago Plus 2, or in the past listed as Alternate, if three concurring sporting events are scheduled for the same time. Both networks have also sometimes been used to show locally produced and FSN-distributed college sports events.

NBC Sports Chicago Plus' HD simulcast feed was previously used as a help channel (an information channel providing instructional information on products offered by the provider) on Comcast systems when no sports events were being telecast (it had been the channel slot for MOJO HD before its 2008 shutdown); it now carries programming originally broadcast on the main NBC Sports Chicago network outside of sporting events.

Originally operating as a gametime-only service, cable providers mainly transmit NBC Sports Chicago Plus and NBC Sports Chicago Plus 2 on non-critical networks, with Comcast carrying the primary Plus feed over the channel slot occupied by regional news channel Chicagoland Television (CLTV) or on another slot (such as channel 101) on its Chicago systems; conversely, Dish Network carries the standard definition feed of the main Plus network on alternating channels assigned by the satellite provider. At times when NBC Sports Chicago Plus and NBC Sports Chicago Plus 2 are broadcasting at the same time, one of the overflows will be carried on the alternate channel, mostly on C-SPAN2, in the case of cable providers.

NBC Sports Chicago HD
NBC Sports Chicago HD is a 1080i high definition simulcast of NBC Sports Chicago. It carries all home and road games involving the Chicago Cubs, Chicago White Sox, Chicago Blackhawks, Chicago Bulls and Chicago Fire as well as all studio shows in high definition. NBC Sports Chicago HD is carried on Comcast, RCN, WOW! Internet, Phone and Cable and AT&T U-verse within the Chicago market, and nationally on DirecTV.

The network's overflow feeds, NBC Sports Chicago Plus and NBC Sports Chicago Plus 2, also maintain HD simulcasts: NBC Sports Chicago Plus HD is available only part-time on Directv, Comcast systems within outer markets and full-time on Comcast systems in the Chicago metro area and on AT&T U-verse, while NBC Sports Chicago Plus 2 HD is available only through RCN, AT&T U-verse and DirecTV (most cable providers carry the Plus 2 feed in standard definition).

See also
 Comcast Network – a Chicago-based general entertainment channel; the network formerly carried a full schedule of American Hockey League games from the Chicago Wolves.

References

External links
 

Chicago
Television channels and stations established in 2004
Companies based in Chicago
2004 establishments in Illinois
Ricketts family
Television stations in Chicago